Gunnar Öhlund (born 9 August 1947) is a Swedish orienteering competitor. He is Relay World Champion from 1974, as a member of the Swedish winning team. His brother, Goran Öhlund is a former World Orienteering Champion. His son, Erik Öhlund competed on the 2008 Swedish Orienteering Team. He currently is a farmer in Ulricehamn, Sweden.

References

1947 births
Living people
Swedish orienteers
Male orienteers
Foot orienteers
World Orienteering Championships medalists